Finocchiona is a salami variety, typical of Tuscany, Florence area.  It is characterized by the use of fennel.

Origins 
Finocchiona originated in  the Renaissance, and possibly even before, in the Late Middle Ages. The use of fennel was an alternative to pepper (a key ingredient of the standard salami), which was very expensive at the time, while fennel grew wild and abundant in the Tuscan countryside. Also, fennel is rich in menthol, and because of its anesthetic qualities, finocchiona was regularly offered by the winemakers of the Chianti area to their customers before tasting their lower quality wines to mask their taste.

Preparation 
Finocchiona's ingredients are chopped pork meat (generally cheek, shoulder, or belly), fennel seeds, red wine, salt, and pepper. It is fermented and then dried for not less than five months. 

A variant,  sbriciolona, is prepared with a coarser grind, and undergoes a shorter drying (not more than a month). This product has to be cut into larger slices than the typical finocchiona and is consumed using a fork and a knife because it tends to crumble.

See also

 Italian cuisine

References

Lunch meat
Italian products with protected designation of origin
Italian sausages
Fermented sausages